This is a list of women writers who were born in Slovenia or whose writings are closely associated with that country.

A
Vera Albreht (1895–1971), poet, children's writer, translator

B
Gabriela Babnik (born 1979), novelist, critic, translator
Mária Bajzek Lukács (born 1960), Hungarian-born Slovene-language writer, educator, editor, translator
Cvetka Bevc (born 1960), poet, prose writer, children's writer, playwright
Berta Bojetu (1946–1997), poet, novelist
Kristina Brenk (1911–2009), children's writer, poet, translator

C
Anica Černej (1900–1944), poet, children's writer

D
Elvira Dolinar (1870–1961), journalist, novelist, feminist

G
Alenka Goljevšček (1933–2017), playwright, young adult writer, essayist
Berta Golob (born 1932), children's writer, poet

H
Milka Hartman (1902–1997), poet

J
 Vida Jeraj (1860–1932), poet.

K
Alma Karlin (1889–1950), travel writer, poet, novelist, writing mainly in German
Jana Kolarič (born 1954), poet, playwright, novelist and translator.
Barbara Korun (born 1963), leading contemporary poet
Tita Kovač Artemis (1930–2016), biographer, novelist
Taja Kramberger (born 1970), poet, essayist, translator
Maruša Krese (1947–2013), poet, short story writer, journalist
Mojca Kumerdej (born 1964), short story writer, novelist, critic
Meta Kušar (born 1952), poet, essayist
Zofka Kveder (1878–1926), early Slovene-language woman writer, short story writer, playwright, journalist, feminist

L
Vesna Lemaić (born 1981), short story writer, novelist
Cvetka Lipuš (born 1966), Austrian-born Slovene-language poet

M
Svetlana Makarovič (born 1939), acclaimed poet, children's writer, actress
Katarina Marinčič (born 1968), novelist, short story writer
Neža Maurer (born 1930), poet, children's and young adults' writer
Mira Mihelič (1912–1985), novelist, translator
Jana Milčinski (1920–2007), novelist, children's writer, journalist, translator

N
Marica Nadlišek Bartol (1867–1940), essayist, short story writer, editor
Lela B. Njatin (born 1953), novelist, artist
Lili Novy (1885–1958), acclaimed poet, poetry translator

P
Pavlina Pajk (1854–1901), novelist, essayist, biographer, feminist
Alenka Puhar (born 1945), biographer, non-fiction writer, journalist, translator
Benka Pulko (born 1967), photographer, travel writer, children's writer, journalist

S
Ifigenija Zagoričnik Simonović, poet, essayist, children's writer
Simona Škrabec (born 1968), critic, columnist, essayist, translator, writing mainly in Spanish and Catalan
Breda Smolnikar (born 1941), novelist, young adults writer
Katja Špur (1908–1991), poet, columnist, children's writer
Anja Štefan (born 1969), children's writer, poet

T
Zora Tavčar (born 1928), poet, short story writer, essayist, translator
Josipina Turnograjska, pen name of Josipina Urbančič, (1833–1854), early Slovene-language letter writer, short story writer

V
Saša Vegri (1934–2010), poet, young adults writer
Maja Vidmar (born 1961), poet
Angela Vode (1892–1985), feminist writer, autobiographer
Marija Vojskovič (1915–1997), short story writer, children's writer
Erika Vouk (born 1941), poet, translator

Z
Zdenka Žebre (1920–2011), novelist, children's writer, autobiographical works about Africa
Irena Žerjal (born 1940), poet, novelist, translator
Bina Štampe Žmavc (born 1951), poet, playwright, children's writer
Svetlana Žuchová (born 1976), novelist, short story writer, translator
Katka Zupančič (1889–1967), children's poet, short story writer, playwright

See also
List of women writers
List of Slovenian writers

References

-
Slovenian
Writers
Writers, women